Mujeres asesinas is a Mexican streaming television series developed by Alicia Luna. It is a reimagined version of the series of the same name, based on the book series written by Marisa Grinstein. The series premiered on Vix+ on 4 November 2022.

Premise 
Each episode presents a stand-alone story in which women face a difficult life because of violent partners, manipulative parents, or humiliating situations, and turn to violence and death to end their situation.

Production

Development 
On 29 June 2022, the series was announced for TelevisaUnivision's streaming platform Vix+, with filming having begun earlier that month. The series is set to premiere on 4 November 2022.

Casting 
On 29 June 2022, it was announced that Yalitza Aparicio would star in an episode of the series. On 19 August 2022, Catherine Siachoque, Barbie Casillas, Macarena García, Jedet, Nicole Curiel, Claudia Martín, and Sara Maldonado were announced in starring roles.

Episodes

References

External links 
 

2020s Mexican television series
2022 Mexican television series debuts
Vix (streaming service) original programming
Spanish-language television shows
Mexican drama television series
Mexican LGBT-related television shows